Isaac Larsen "Jack" Scales (2 September 1897 – 13 March 1973) was an Australian rules footballer who played with Fitzroy in the Victorian Football League (VFL).

Scales was the younger brother of Fitzroy player Joe Scales.

Notes

External links 

1897 births
1973 deaths
Australian rules footballers from Victoria (Australia)
Australian Rules footballers: place kick exponents
Fitzroy Football Club players